The Kimberley wedge-snout ctenotus (Ctenotus tantillus)  is a species of skink found in the Northern Territory and Western Australia.

References

tantillus
Reptiles described in 1975
Taxa named by Glen Milton Storr